Dioryctria sysstratiotes is a species of snout moth in the genus Dioryctria. It was described by Harrison Gray Dyar Jr. in 1919 and is known from Guatemala.

References

Moths described in 1919
sysstratiotes